Kachu (also Romanized as Kāchū and Kachow; also known as Kajū) is a village in Kambel-e Soleyman Rural District, in the Central District of Chabahar County, Sistan and Baluchestan Province, Iran. At the 2006 census, its population was 86, in 23 families.

References 

Populated places in Chabahar County